is a Japanese mystery thriller created first as a TV drama and later as a film. It is about Detective Jun Shibata, who handles unsolved cases with her hardened partner Tōru Mayama.

The television series was broadcast in 11 episodes between 8 January and 19 March 1999. A two-hour "special drama" was then broadcast on 24 December 1999. The series has been called "epoch-making" in the police procedural genre on Japanese television.

Television

Cast
 Miki Nakatani - Shibata Jun
 Atsuro Watabe - Mayama Tôru
 Sarina Suzuki - Kido Aya
 Yu Tokui - Kondo Akio
 Hidekazu Nagae - Taniguchi Tsuyoshi
 Kenichi Yajima - Hayashida Seiichi
 Masashi Arifuku - Nagao Noboru
 Mari Nishio - Osawa Maiko
 Goro Noguchi - Saotome Jin
 Raita Ryu - Nonomura Koutarou
 Shigeru Izumiya -Tsubosaka Kunio

Episode Titles
01: "Phone Call from the Dead Man"
02: "Punishment Table of Ice"
03: "The Wiretapped Murderer"
04: "The Room of Certain Death"
05: "The Man Who Saw the Future"
06: "The Wickedest Bombing-Demon"
07: "Death Curse of the Oil Painting"
08: "Farewell, Lovely Cutthroat"
09: "Future Revenge of the Past"
10: "Your Own Two Eyes"
11: "The Kiss of Death's Flavor"

Production
 Screenwriter: Nishiogi Yumie
 Producer: Ueda Hiroki
 Directors: Tsutsumi Yukihiko, Kaneko Fuminori, Imai Natsuki, Isano Hideki
 Music: Mitake Akira

Film (2000)

Cast
Shibata Jun: Nakatani Miki
Mayama Tôru: Watabe Atsuro
Hideyo Amamoto		
Inuko Inuyama	
David Ito	
Izumi Pinko	
Kunio Tsubosaka: Shigeru Izumiya
Hairi Katagiri		
Kera
Koyuki
Katsuyuki Murai	
Katsuhisa Namase
Nanako Ookôchi: Nanako Ôkôchi
Kôtarô Nonomura: Raita Ryu
Toshiya Sakai
Aya Kido Sarina Suzuki
Tomorowo Taguchi	
Masahiro Takaki
Akio Kondô Yu Tokui
Kenichi Yajima

Production
Director: Yukihiko Tsutsumi
Music: Akira Mitake 	
Cinematography: Satoru Karasawa
Editing: Soichi Ueno
Visual effects supervisor: Fumihiko Sori
Visual effects(Renderman): Bernard Edlington

References

External links

1999 Japanese television series debuts
1999 Japanese television series endings
Kin'yō Dorama
2000 films
Television shows written by Yumie Nishiogi
Tokyo Metropolitan Police Department in fiction
Japanese detective television drama series
2000s Japanese films